Nikolay Nikolayevich Gritsenko (Russian:Николай Николаевич Гриценко; 8 May 1856, Novokuznetsk - 8 December 1900, Menton, France) was a Russian painter who specialized in maritime art and seascapes.

Biography 
His father was a physician and his mother was a midwife. At that time, he was already trying his hand at painting watercolors.

His talent was noted by his superiors and, in 1885, he became a "guest-student" (auditor) at the Imperial Academy of Fine Arts, where he came under the guidance of the maritime artist, Lev Lagorio. In 1887, he was sent to Paris, at government expense, to study with Professor Alexey Bogolyubov. While there, he also attended workshops by Fernand Cormon. He would return to France throughout his career. Although he never had a showing at the Salon, in 1896, he had one at the galleries of Paul Durand-Ruel.  

In 1890, he took part in the Eastern journey of Nicholas II, joining his retinue in Trieste. He exhibited at the Imperial Academy and with the Peredvizhniki.

He died of tuberculosis while in Menton, France, and is buried in the Russian cemetery there. In 1902, a major exhibition of his paintings was held in St. Petersburg.

His wife, Lyubov Pavlovna Tretyakova (1870-1928), was the daughter of the philanthropist and art collector, Pavel Tretyakov. After his death, she married the artist Léon Bakst.

References

Further reading 
 Biographical notes from the Brockhaus and Efron Encyclopedic Dictionary @ WikiSource
 Biography @ the Russian Art Gallery

External links 

More works by Gritsenko @ ArtNet
Biographical notes and works @ Воскресный день

1856 births
1900 deaths
Russian painters
Maritime paintings
Imperial Academy of Arts alumni
Russian sailors
20th-century deaths from tuberculosis
Tuberculosis deaths in France